Jacopino Consetti (1651–1726) was an Italian painter. Born in Modena, he was active in Este, and was named superintendent of the Galleria Estense. He was the father of the painter Antonio Consetti (1686–1767), who became a pupil of Giovanni Giuseppe dal Sole.

References

1651 births
1726 deaths
17th-century Italian painters
Italian male painters
18th-century Italian painters
Italian Baroque painters
Painters from Modena
18th-century Italian male artists